Live from the Sun is a live album released in 2000 by the American heavy metal band Dokken. The album captures the reunited Dokken, minus guitarist George Lynch, at the Sun Theater in Anaheim, CA on November 4, 1999, running through a live set of some of their greatest hits, including two songs from the then-recently released Erase the Slate album. A video of the performance was also released both on VHS and DVD formats.

Track listing
"Erase the Slate" - 4:21
"Kiss of Death" - 5:22
"The Hunter" - 3:57
"Into the Fire" - 5:38
"Maddest Hatter" - 5:00
"Too High to Fly" - 13:50
"Breaking the Chains" - 4:07
"Paris Is Burning"* - 4:06
"Alone Again" - 6:50
"It's Not Love" - 9:11
"Tooth and Nail" - 4:39
"In My Dreams" - 6:14

 *CD Bonus track on Japanese version of the album.

Personnel

Dokken
Don Dokken - vocals
Reb Beach - guitar, backing vocals
Jeff Pilson - bass, bass pedals, backing vocals
Mick Brown - drums, backing vocals

Production
Tom Fletcher - producer, engineer, mixing
Phil Soussan - Pro-Tools editing

References

Dokken live albums
2000 live albums
CMC International live albums
SPV/Steamhammer live albums
Dokken video albums
2000 video albums
Live video albums